The Mercedes-Benz OM605 is a  inline-five cylinder (R5/I5) double overhead camshaft (DOHC) diesel engine with indirect injection manufactured by Mercedes-Benz between 1993 and 2001. It replaced the single overhead camshaft (SOHC) OM602 engine.

It uses a Bosch electronically controlled inline injection pump (ERE) except in the W124 where it uses a Bosch mechanically governed inline injection pump (Bosch M pump with RSF governor).

It is related to the straight-4 2.0 and 2.2 litre OM604 and the straight-6 3.0 litre OM606 engines.

Design 

As per the OM602 the engine has a cast iron block and aluminum cylinder head, the block has 6 main caps, they are held by two bolts per cap. The head is a DOHC design with 4 valves x cylinder and split intake ports. As per the OM602 it has hydraulic bucket type lifters, thus requiring no periodical valve adjustment. A big difference when compared to its turbo predecessors is the intercooler

It has a double row timing chain that drives the injection pump and the camshafts, the sprocket is on the exhaust camshaft and both cams are connected by a gear drive, while the oil pump is driven by a separate single row chain

The main differences between the naturally aspirated and the turbocharged versions are the cylinder head, injection pump, valves, camshafts, rods, intake and exhaust manifolds and some minor differences like oil feed and return holes for the turbo and different crankcase ventilation system, valve cover and plastic engine cover

Specifications

See also 

 List of Mercedes-Benz engines

OM605
Diesel engines by model
Straight-five engines